NNS Okpabana is a  high endurance cutter which formerly served with the U.S. Coast Guard as
USCGC Gallatin (WHEC-721). Built at Avondale Shipyards near New Orleans, Louisiana, Gallatin was named for Albert Gallatin, the fourth and longest serving United States Secretary of the Treasury.  Gallatin completed her final patrol 11 December 2013 and was decommissioned in 2014 before being transferred to the Nigerian Navy.

Construction
Gallatin was laid down at Avondale Shipyards on 17 April 1967, as the seventh ship of her class. She was launched on 18 November 1967 and was commissioned on 20 December 1968.

Design

The ship is designed as a high endurance cutter. Gallantin was one of the first naval vessels built with a combined diesel or gas (CODOG) turbine propulsion plant. Two  diameter controllable pitch propellers, combined with a retractable and rotatable bow propulsion unit, give the ship high maneuverability.

The ship's capabilities are enhanced by advanced air search and surface search radars including the AN/SPS-73 digital surface radar system that incorporates a state of the art computerized collision avoidance system. She uses the Shipboard Command and Control System (SCCS) which uses a network of computers including large screen displays and a dedicated satellite network for communications. A closed circuit TV system enables the Commanding Officer to monitor flight deck operations, machinery conditions, towing, damage control, and related activities from the bridge.

History
Gallatins missions included enforcement of all U.S. maritime laws and treaties, fisheries conservation, marine pollution response, defense readiness, and search and rescue. Gallatin served with the United States Coast Guard until 31 March 2014, when she was decommissioned. On 7 May, she was transferred to the Nigerian Navy and renamed Okpabana.

Nigerian service
On 19 February 2016 NNS Okpabana recaptured the pirated tanker Maximus in the Gulf of Guinea, killing one pirate and capturing six others.

Photos

References

External links

 "Gallatin home page" U.S. Coast Guard, 30 August 2008
 "History of the Gallatin" U.S. Coast Guard, 9 September 2008
 "NNS OKPABANA ARRIVED NIGERIA AMID CHEERS" Michael Mortimer, 20 March 2017

Hamilton-class cutters of the Nigerian Navy
Hamilton-class cutters
Ships built in Bridge City, Louisiana
1967 ships